The District No. 72 School represents small, rural school-houses in Dakota County in the U.S. state of Minnesota. It was built in 1882, with a bell-tower, clapboard siding, a steep gabled roof, and pediments. It continues to be used as a community center and township hall. It is now known as the Waterford Community Center.

References

Buildings and structures in Dakota County, Minnesota
Defunct schools in Minnesota
Former school buildings in the United States
School buildings completed in 1882
School buildings on the National Register of Historic Places in Minnesota
National Register of Historic Places in Dakota County, Minnesota